Bishnu Sharma is a Nepali politician and a member of the House of Representatives of the federal parliament of Nepal. She was elected under the proportional representation system from CPN UML, filling the reservation seat for Khas Arya group as well as women.

References

Living people
Nepal MPs 2017–2022
Nepal Communist Party (NCP) politicians
Communist Party of Nepal (Unified Marxist–Leninist) politicians
1955 births